Alan Stephen Hopes (born 17 March 1944) is a British Roman Catholic prelate and former Anglican priest. From 2013 to 2022 he served as the Bishop of East Anglia. He was previously an auxiliary bishop of Westminster for ten years.

Early life and education
Hopes was born in Oxford, England, on 17 March 1944. He was educated at Oxford High School until he moved to London in 1956, when he attended Enfield Grammar School. In 1963 he began a degree in theology at King's College London, graduating in 1966. He then attended Warminster Theological College, an Anglican theological college to train for ministry in the Church of England.

Anglican ministry
Hopes was ordained as an Anglican priest in 1968. As a priest in the Church of England he was Vicar of St Paul's Church, Tottenham from 1978 to 1994.

Roman Catholic ministry

Priesthood
In 1994, he was received into the Roman Catholic Church. He was ordained a Roman Catholic priest on 4 December 1995. For three years he served as assistant priest at Our Lady of Victories in Kensington, London, before becoming parish priest of the Holy Redeemer and St Thomas More Parish, Chelsea.

In 2001, Hopes was appointed Vicar General of the Archdiocese of Westminster and in 2002 became a member of the Committee for Liturgy and Worship of the Catholic Bishops' Conference of England and Wales.

Episcopate

On 4 January 2003, Pope Benedict XVI appointed him titular bishop of Cuncacestre and an auxiliary bishop of Westminster, making him one of the most senior members of Catholic clergy to have converted in the 1990s. On 24 January 2003 he received episcopal consecration, along with the now Archbishop Bernard Longley, in Westminster Cathedral from Cardinal Cormac Murphy-O'Connor. The principal co-consecrating bishops were Bishop Arthur Roche of Leeds and Bishop Kieran Conry of Arundel and Brighton. As an auxiliary bishop, Hopes had particular pastoral oversight of the deaneries of West London.

In October 2010, Hopes was appointed episcopal delegate of the Catholic Bishops' Conference of England and Wales for the implementation of the apostolic constitution Anglicanorum coetibus.

On 11 June 2013, Pope Francis appointed Hopes the fourth Bishop of East Anglia and he was installed on 16 July 2013 at St John the Baptist Cathedral, Norwich.

On 28 October 2016 he was appointed by Pope Francis a member of the Congregation for Divine Worship and the Discipline of the Sacraments.

Hopes submitted his resignation as required upon turning 75 and Pope Francis accepted his resignation on 11 October 2022. He remained as apostolic administrator of the diocese until the installation of his successor on 14 December 2022.

References

External links

1944 births
Living people
Alumni of King's College London
Associates of King's College London
People from Oxford
Anglican priest converts to Roman Catholicism
20th-century English Anglican priests
People educated at Enfield Grammar School
21st-century Roman Catholic bishops in England
21st-century Roman Catholic titular bishops
Alumni of St Boniface Missionary College, Warminster
Members of the Congregation for Divine Worship and the Discipline of the Sacraments
Roman Catholic bishops of East Anglia
English Roman Catholic bishops